Anthony Phillips (5 February 1940 – 20 June 2008) was a Barbadian weightlifter. He competed at the 1968 Summer Olympics and the 1972 Summer Olympics.

References

External links
 

1940 births
2008 deaths
Barbadian male weightlifters
Olympic weightlifters of Barbados
Weightlifters at the 1968 Summer Olympics
Weightlifters at the 1972 Summer Olympics
Place of birth missing
Weightlifters at the 1967 Pan American Games
Weightlifters at the 1971 Pan American Games
Pan American Games medalists in weightlifting
Pan American Games silver medalists for Barbados
Medalists at the 1967 Pan American Games
Medalists at the 1971 Pan American Games
Commonwealth Games medallists in weightlifting
Commonwealth Games silver medallists for Barbados
Weightlifters at the 1970 British Commonwealth Games
Medallists at the 1970 British Commonwealth Games